Esko Emil Kiviranta (born 2 September 1950) is a Finnish politician representing the Finnish Centre Party (Keskusta). He has been a member of the Finnish Parliament since 19 March 2003. 

Kiviranta was born in Sauvo. He holds a Master of Science in Agriculture and Forestry 1974 (University of Helsinki) and a Master of Laws 1979 (University of Helsinki).

References

1950 births
Living people
People from Sauvo
Finnish Lutherans
Centre Party (Finland) politicians
Members of the Parliament of Finland (2003–07)
Members of the Parliament of Finland (2007–11)
Members of the Parliament of Finland (2011–15)
Members of the Parliament of Finland (2015–19)
Members of the Parliament of Finland (2019–23)
University of Helsinki alumni